is a private university in Shimonoseki, Yamaguchi, Japan.

The predecessor of the school was founded in 1872, and it was chartered as a women's junior college in 1964.  The school's emblem (a stylized plum blossom) and kanji name  reflect the names of the two schools merged to form Baiko Gakuin.

In 1967, the school began to operate as a four-year college, which became co-ed in 2001; the women's junior college continued to run within the university until 2006, when it was dissolved and its operations folded into the university.  The school has a long affiliation with its namesake women's junior high and high school, Baiko jo Gakuin, also in Shimonoseki.

The school's Latin motto ut filii lucis ambulate ('let us walk as children of light'), drawn from Ephesians 5:8, reflects the Christian influence on its founding, an influence still reflected today in its daily chapel services and hospitality to Christian teachers.

Faculties (Undergraduate Schools)

School of (Japanese) Literature
Department of Japanese Literature
Major in Literature and Arts
Major in Japanese Language and Literature
Major in Area Studies

School of International Languages and Cultures
Department of English Language and Literature
Major in English Language
Major in English and American Literature
Major in International Business
Major in Children's English Education
Department of East Asian Languages and Cultures
Major in Chinese Language and Culture
Major in Korean Language and Culture
Major in Japanese Language and Culture

School of Child Development Studies
Department of Child Development Studies
Major in Children's Education
Major in Early Childhood Education

Graduate Schools
Japanese Literature
English and American Literature

Institutes 
Baiko Gakuin University Institute of Language Education
Baiko Gakuin University Institute of Area Studies
Baiko Gakuin University Museum
Information Education Center
International Center
English Education Center
University Library
生涯学習センター
梅光多世代交流支援センター

Sister Schools
Baiko Jogakuin High School & Junior High School
Baiko Gakuin Kindergarten

See also
Shimonoseki Station
Hatabu Station
Shimonoseki City

External links
 Official website 
  (English)

References 

Educational institutions established in 1872
Christian universities and colleges in Japan
Private universities and colleges in Japan
Shimonoseki
Universities and colleges in Yamaguchi Prefecture
1872 establishments in Japan
Former women's universities and colleges in Japan